Pacari Chocolate is a chocolate company operating out of Quito, Ecuador. Pacari Chocolate was founded as a family business in 2002 by Santiago Peralta and Carla Barbotó, who own and operate the company. The company name 'Pacari' comes from the Quechua word meaning 'nature'. The chocolate is stated to be dairy, soy, chemical, transgenic and gluten free.  

Pacari Chocolate is the first chocolate company to receive a biodynamic certification from Demeter International. Pacari Chocolate products are available in health food and luxury chocolate outlets in the United States, Europe, South America and Malaysia.

Awards

Pacari Chocolate has received  national and world awards from chocolate producers and chocolate competitions throughout the United States and abroad.

International Chocolate Awards – World Final

|-
| 2013
| Pacari Chocolate – Piura-Quemazon
| Overall Winner – Gold
| 
|-
| 2013
| Pacari Chocolate – 70% Raw Bar
| Overall Winner – Silver
| 
|-
| 2012
| Pacari Chocolate – 70% Raw Bar
| Overall Winner – Gold
| 
|-
| 2012
| Pacari Chocolate – 70% Piura-Quemazon
| Overall Winner – Silver
| 
|-
| 2012
| Pacari Chocolate – 60% Cacao with Lemongrass
| Flavored Dark Chocolate – Gold
| 
|-
| 2012
| Pacari Chocolate – Raw 70% Chocolate Bar With Salt And Cacao Nibs
| Flavored Dark Chocolate – Silver
| 
|-
| 2012
| Pacari Chocolate – Raw 70% Chocolate Bar with Maca
| Flavored Dark Chocolate – Silver
| 
|}
– Sources:

See also

 List of bean-to-bar chocolate manufacturers

References

External links
 

Food and drink companies established in 2002
2002 establishments in Ecuador
Ecuadorian chocolate companies
Ecuadorian brands
Organic chocolate